C01-A035 is a Novichok agent. It is the methyl phosphorofluoridate ester of phosgene oxime.

See also
C01-A039

References

External links

Novichok agents
Acetylcholinesterase inhibitors
Phosphorofluoridates
Oxime esters
Organochlorides
Methyl esters